Zoé Jiménez Corretjer is an author from Puerto Rico. She is a professor in the Department of Humanities, University of Puerto Rico at Humacao.

Life

Jiménez Corretjer born in San Juan, Puerto Rico has a Doctorate Degree from Temple University in Philadelphia and has taken several professional seminars at the Universidad Complutense in Madrid, Spain, and at the Ateneo de Madrid. Since 1996, she has taught literature and humanities at the University of Puerto Rico. She is the director of The Journal of Humanistic Studies and Literature from her department.  Dr. Jiménez contributes as External Evaluator for the Department of Modern Languages for the University of Hong Kong and is part of the group of bibliographers for the Modern Language Association.  She works creating and adding bibliography for the MLA Bibliographical Index.  Dr. Jiménez-Corretjer belongs to a literary tradition in Puerto Rico. She is a recognized writer and professor.  Some of her contributions to literature are the Theory of the Feminine Fantastic; a new aesthetical and theoretical terminology used now in literary research.  She has published fifteen books. Her creative works have been added to several literary anthologies and academic books and its consider to be part of the controvertible group of writers that conform the "Puerto Rican Generation of the Eighties". Her latest investigation published by Ediciones Puerto, is the first book about the aesthetics and philosophical ideas in the poetry of José María Lima.

Publications

Jiménez Corretjer has published books of poetry, short stories, fiction, and academic essays.:

 Las menos cuarto (Madrid, 1985)
 Crónicas Interplanetarias (Interplanetary Chronicles) (1991)
 Poemanaciones (1992)
 Cuentos de una bruja (2000)
 El Fantástico Femenino en España y América (The Fantastic Feminine in Spain and America) (2001)
  La mano que escribe: Literatura, Arte y Pensamiento (The Writing Hand: Literature, Art and Thought) (2007)
 Cánticos del Lago (Canticles of the Lake) (2007)
 Antigua Vía (Ancient Way) (2007)
 Sala de Espera (Waiting Room) (2007)
 Rosa Náutica (Nautic Rose) (Madrid: Torremozas, 2008)
 Puerto Nube (Terranova Editores, 2008)
 Las Camelias de Amelia (Fiction, 2009)
 Lógicas del Extravío: Anatomía Existencial en la poesía de José María Lima (Ediciones Puerto, 2010)
 La Boca de la Verdad (Edibom, 2010)
 Tempo Antico(Edibom Edizioni, Italy 2010) (Translations of her works to Italian)
 Rascacielos(Casa de los Poetas Editores, San Juan, 2011)
 El Cantar de la Memoria(Casa de los Poetas, 2012)

She has been included in several important anthologies. Two of them are the Antología de Poesía Puertorriqueña compiled by Mercedes López Baralt and the Antología de Poesía Latinomericana del Siglo XXI edited by Julio Ortega.  Jiménez Corretjer has also contributed writing scripts for the television program En la punta de la lengua.

Awards
Jiménez Corretjer obtained the Francisco Matos Paoli First Poetry Medal from the University of Puerto Rico in 1986. She received in 2008 the National Essay Award 2007 from the Pen Club of Puerto Rico for her book La mano que escribe: Literatura, Arte y Pensamiento.  This is one of the most prestigious awards in literature on the island.

Scholarship on writer

The following critics have written about Jiménez Corretjer's works: Priscilla Gac-Artigas, Guillermina Wallas, Eugenia Toledo-Keyser, Aida Toledo, Mercedes López Baralt, José E. Santos, Mario Cancel, Héctor Cavallari, Concha Alborg, Isaac Donoso, Andrea Gallo, Annunziata Campa and Ángel Aguirre.

All the information provided for this Wikipedia source has come from the following Reliable academic sources:

López Baralt, Mercedes.  Literatura Puertorriqueña del Siglo XX.  Antología. San Juan: EDUPR, 2004.

Martínez Márquez, Alberto y Mario Cancel.  El límite volcado.  Antología de la Generación de Poetas de los Ochenta.  San Juan:  Isla Negra, 2000.

Meléndez, Joserramón.  Palabra sitiada: estearbitrariocolách.  San Juan: 1984.

Moreira, Rubén Alejandro.  Antología de poesía puertorriqueña.  Vol. IV Contemporánea.  San Juan:  Tríptico, 1993.

Nueva poesía hispanoamericana.  Perú: Ediciones Lord Byron, 2005.

Ortega, Julio. Antología de la poesía latinoamericana del siglo XXI: el turno y la transición. México: Editorial Siglo XXI, 1997.

Pausides, Alex, Pedro A. Valdez, et al.  Los nuevos Caníbales. Una antología de la más reciente poesía del Caribe Hispano. Vol. 2. San Juan: Isla Negra, 2003.

(Per)versiones desde el paraíso: poesía puertorriqueña de entresiglos.  Huelva: Aullido, Núm. 14, 2005.

Puebla, Manuel de la, ed. Poesía joven en Puerto Rico. Río Piedras: Mairena, 1981. Puebla, Manuel de la y Marcos Reyes Dávila, eds. Poesía universitaria. Río Piedras: Mairena, 1982.

Reyes, Marcos y Manuel de la Puebla, eds. Antología de poesía puertorriqueña 1984-1985 Río Piedras Mairena, 1986.

Rivera Avilés, Sotero, comp. Pulso de poesía: antología de poesía premiada 1981-1990. Mayagüez: Instituto Comercial de Puerto Rico, 1992.

Rodríguez Nietzsche, Vicente et al., comps. Albizu en dos generaciones: Poemas.  San Juan: Instituto de Cultura. 1994.

Ruiz Rosado, Leticia. Poesía en el tiempo: Homenaje a la poesía Latinoamericana. Mayagüez: Colectivo Identidad, 2006.

Santiago Díaz, Orlando, ed. Decimario nacional decimario puertorriqúeño contemporáneo Centro Isla, PR.   Comité Arnigos del Author Puertorriqueño, 1994.

Santos Febres, Mayra.  Cuentos de oficio. Antología de cuentistas emergentes en Puerto Rico. Carolina: Terranova, 2005.

Santos Febres, Mayra, ed Mal(h)ab(l)ar: antología de nueva literatura puertorriqueña. PR: Yagunzo Press, 1997.

Vega, José Luis.  “Treinta años de poesía puertorriqueña.”  22 Conferencias de literatura puertorriqueña.  Edgar Martínez Masdeu Ed.  San Juan:  Ateneo Puertorriqueño, 1994.

Voces Nuevas, XVIII Selección.  Madrid: Torremozas, 2005.

See also

 List of Puerto Rican writers
List of Puerto Ricans
 Puerto Rican literature

References

Living people
People from San Juan, Puerto Rico
Puerto Rican women writers
Puerto Rican poets
Temple University alumni
American women poets
Year of birth missing (living people)